Xenon dioxydifluoride is an inorganic chemical compound with the formula XeO2F2. At room temperature it exists as a metastable solid, which decomposes slowly into xenon difluoride, but the cause of this decomposition is unknown.

Preparation 
Xenon dioxydifluoride is prepared by reacting xenon trioxide with xenon oxytetrafluoride.

 XeO3 + XeOF4 -> 2XeO2F2

References 

Nonmetal halides
Oxyfluorides
Xenon(VI) compounds